Lloyd Schwartz (born November 29, 1941) is an American poet, and the Frederick S. Troy Professor of English Emeritus at the University of Massachusetts Boston.  He was the classical music editor of The Boston Phoenix, a publication that is now defunct. He is Poet Laureate of Somerville, Massachusetts (2019-2021), Senior Music Editor at New York Arts and the Berkshire Review for the Arts, and a regular commentator for NPR's Fresh Air.

Biography 

Lloyd Schwartz was born in Brooklyn, New York, graduated from Queens College in 1962 and earned his Ph.D. from Harvard in 1976.

Schwartz's books of poetry include  Who's on First? New and Selected Poems (University of Chicago Press, 2021), Little Kisses (University of Chicago Press, 2017, Cairo Traffic (University of Chicago Press, 2000) and the chapbook Greatest Hits 1973-2000 (Pudding House Press, 2003), which were preceded by Goodnight, Gracie (1992) and These People (1981). He co-edited the collection Elizabeth Bishop and Her Art (University of Michigan Press, 1983). In 1990, he adapted These People for the Poets' Theatre in a production called These People: Voices for the Stage, which he also directed.

Schwartz was awarded the Pulitzer Prize for Criticism in 1994 for his work with The Boston Phoenix. and the Guggenheim Foundation Fellowship in Poetry in 2019.

Schwartz served as co-editor of an edition of the collected works of Elizabeth Bishop for the Library of America, entitled Elizabeth Bishop: Poems, Prose, and Letters (2008) and edited the centennial edition of Elizabeth Bishop's Prose for Farrar, Straus and Giroux (2011).

His poems, articles, and reviews have appeared in The New Yorker, The Atlantic, The Wall Street Journal, Vanity Fair, The New Republic, The Paris Review, Ploughshares, Agni, The Pushcart Prize, The Best American Poetry, and The Best of the Best American Poetry. Between 1968 and 1982 he worked as an actor in the Harvard Dramatic Club, HARPO, The Pooh Players, Poly-Arts, and the NPR series The Spider's Web, playing such roles as Scrooge (A Christmas Carol), the Mock Turtle (Alice in Wonderland), Froth (Measure for Measure), Trofimov (The Cherry Orchard), Zeal-of-the-Land Busy (Bartholomew Fair), The Worm (In the Jungle of Cities), Krapp (Krapp's Last Tape), the Disciple John (Jesus: A Passion Play for Cambridge), and played a leading role in Russell Merritt's short satirical film The Drones Must Die. He also directed two operas, Ravel's L'Heure Espagnole (Boston Summer Opera Theatre) and Stravinsky's Mavra (New England Chamber Opera Group), 1972. He has appeared in The Poets' Theatre performances of Dylan Thomas's Under Milk Wood (2014) and The Word Exchange (2015).

References 

Queens College, City University of New York alumni
1941 births
Harvard University alumni
Pulitzer Prize for Criticism winners
Classical music radio presenters
Living people
University of Massachusetts Boston faculty
20th-century American poets
20th-century American non-fiction writers
21st-century American poets
21st-century American non-fiction writers
American male poets
American male non-fiction writers
Writers from Brooklyn
Poets from New York (state)
20th-century American male writers
21st-century American male writers